Given a directed graph G = (V, E), a path cover is a set of directed paths such that every vertex v ∈ V belongs to at least one path.  Note that a path cover may include paths of length 0 (a single vertex).

A path cover may also refer to a vertex-disjoint path cover, i.e., a set of paths such that every vertex v ∈ V belongs to exactly one path.

Properties

A theorem by Gallai and Milgram shows that the number of paths in a smallest path cover cannot be larger than the number of vertices in the largest independent set. In particular, for any graph G, there is a path cover P and an independent set I such that I contains exactly one vertex from each path in P. Dilworth's theorem follows as a corollary of this result.

Computational complexity

Given a directed graph G, the minimum path cover problem consists of finding a path cover for G having the fewest paths.

A minimum path cover consists of one path if and only if there is a Hamiltonian path in G. The Hamiltonian path problem is NP-complete, and hence the minimum path cover problem is NP-hard. However, if the graph is acyclic, the problem is in complexity class P and can therefore be solved in polynomial time by transforming it into a matching problem, see https://walkccc.me/CLRS/Chap26/Problems/26-2/.

Applications
The applications of minimum path covers include software testing. For example, if the graph G represents all possible execution sequences of a computer program, then a path cover is a set of test runs that covers each program statement at least once.

See also
 Covering (disambiguation)#Mathematics

Notes

References
.
.
.
.

Graph theory objects